The Douglas Model 423 was a bomber aircraft design developed by American aircraft manufacturer Douglas to compete with the Convair B-36 design for a major U.S. Army Air Force contract for an intercontinental bomber in 1941. Although identified as the Douglas XB-31 in some publications, the project documents indicate that it was designed much later than the R40-B competition.

Development
In April 1941, the possibility of Great Britain falling to Nazi Germany seemed very real, and so the United States Army Air Corps unveiled a competition for a long-range bomber with intercontinental range (10,000 miles), making it capable of conducting air-strikes on Nazi-occupied Europe from US bases. Douglas stated that it did not wish to produce an 'out-and-out 10,000-mile (16,090 km) airplane project', instead proposing the Model 423 with a range of 6,000 miles (9,654 km). The Douglas Model 423 was eventually rejected in favor of the Consolidated Model 36, which became the Convair B-36 Peacemaker.

Specifications (Model 423)
(Note: The primary source labels this project as the XB-31, which was much smaller, earlier project, competing with the B-29 and B-32)

See also

References

Citations

Bibliography

 Francillon, René J. McDonnell Douglas Aircraft since 1920. London: Putnam & Company Ltd., 1979. .
 Jones, Lloyd S. U.S. Bombers: B-1 1928 to B-1 1980s. Fallbrook, California: Aero Publishers, Inc., 1974. .

External links

Cancelled military aircraft projects of the United States
Model 423
Douglas 423
High-wing aircraft
Four-engined piston aircraft